Justin Buchholz (born August 22, 1983) is a Filipino-American former mixed martial arts fighter. A professional from 2005 until 2018, he fought in the UFC, World Series of Fighting,

Background
Buchholz graduated from Lathrop High School (Alaska) in 2002, where he competed in wrestling.

Mixed martial arts career
Buchholz is a former ICON Sport and Showdown Fights Lightweight champion. He has also fought in EliteXC and he held an 8–1 record before signing with the Ultimate Fighting Championship (UFC).

Ultimate Fighting Championship
He lost his first fight in the UFC at UFC Fight Night 12 against Matt Wiman on January 23, 2008. Buchholz earned his first victory at UFC 86 against TUF 5 contestant and three-to-one favorite, Corey Hill.

Buchholz was defeated by Terry Etim via D'Arce choke at UFC 99. Buchholz and Etim traded heavy kicks and punches for the first few minutes in the bout before Buchholz landed a hard right hand which broke Etim's nose. Buchholz pounced, but Etim was able to survive the round. Etim went back to his measured gameplan in round two, landing with some hard leg kicks, before hurting Buchholz with multiple knees from the clinch. A scramble ensued before the fight went to the mat and from there Etim was able to lock in the D'Arce choke to finish the fight.

In his next fight, Buchholz faced Jeremy Stephens, where he lost due to a cut in the first round.

Buchholz was defeated by Mac Danzig on February 6, 2010 at UFC 109. He was subsequently released from the UFC.

Independent
Buchholz fell to a fourth straight defeat on February 25, 2011 in his first post UFC fight as he lost to Jason Meaders via TKO (doctor stoppage) in the first round.

Buchholz picked up a win on April 16, 2011 defeating Steve Sharp by submission (rear naked choke) in the first round.

Buchholz then fought fellow UFC veteran Steve Lopez May 21, 2011 at SCC: Superior Cage Combat 1. Buchholz won by a kick.

Buchholz defeated Thiago Meller via unanimous decision on August 20, 2011 at SCC: Superior Cage Combat 2.

Buchholz had a rematch with Clay Collard, which he lost by split decision.

On September 20, 2017 Buchholz accepted a short notice fight against Marques Facine at AFC 133 and won via TKO in the first round. Facine fell off the mat and Buchholz started unleashing soccer kicks to the body, his last attempt grazed Facine's head before the referee called for a stoppage. The referee awarded the win to Buchholz calling the last kick as accidental and it did not decide the outcome of the fight as Facine was defenseless in absorbing the kicks to the body.

Personal life
At present Buchholz hosts his bi-weekly MMA Podcast, Stud Radio (formerly TAM Radio), and continues to corner fighters. In January 2016 he stepped into the role of Team Alpha Male head coach, only to depart from the team in mid-January 2018.

Championships and accomplishments
Icon Sport
Icon Sport Lightweight Championship (One time)
Showdown Fights
Showdown Fights Lightweight Championship (One time)

Mixed martial arts record

| Loss
| align=center|16–11
| Carlton Minus
| Decision (unanimous)
| Alaska Fighting Championship 140
| 
| align=center| 3
| align=center| 5:00
| Anchorage, Alaska, United States
|
|-
| Win
| align=center|16–10
| Marques Facine
| TKO (punches and body kicks)
| Alaska Fighting Championship 133
| 
| align=center| 1
| align=center| 2:25
| Anchorage, Alaska, United States
|Catchweight (175 lbs) bout.
|-
| Loss
| align=center|15–10
| Ernest Chavez
| KO (punch)
| The Warriors Cage 23: Halloween Havoc 5
| 
| align=center| 1
| align=center| 3:22
| Porterville, California, United States
|
|-
| Loss
| align=center|15–9
| Lewis Gonzalez
| Decision (split)
| WSOF 16
| 
| align=center| 3
| align=center| 5:00
| Sacramento, California, United States
|Welterweight debut.
|-
|Loss
|align=center|15–8
|Clay Collard
|Decision (split)
|Showdown Fights: Buchholz vs. Collard 2
|
|align=center|5
|align=center|5:00
|Orem, Utah, United States
|
|-
|Win
|align=center|15–7
|Gordon Bell
|KO (punch)
|Showdown Fights: Buchholz vs. Bell
|
|align=center|1
|align=center|2:06
|Orem, Utah, United States
|
|-
|Win
|align=center|14–7
|David Castillo
|TKO (punches)
|Showdown Fights: Buchholz vs. Castillo
|
|align=center|3
|align=center|3:29
|Orem, Utah, United States
|
|-
|Win
|align=center|13–7
|Clay Collard
|Submission (guillotine choke)
|Showdown Fights - Burkman vs. Yager
|
|align=center|3
|align=center|1:35
|Orem, Utah, United States
|
|-
|Loss
|align=center|12–7
|John Gunderson
|Submission (kimura)
|Superior Cage Combat 4
|
|align=center|3
|align=center|2:34
|Las Vegas, Nevada, United States
|For the SCC Lightweight Championship.
|-
|Win
|align=center|12–6
|Thiago Meller
|Decision (unanimous)
|Superior Cage Combat 2
|
|align=center|3
|align=center|5:00
|Las Vegas, Nevada, United States
|
|-
|Win
|align=center|11–6
|Steve Lopez
|KO (front kick)
|Superior Cage Combat 1
|
|align=center|3
|align=center|4:30
|Las Vegas, Nevada, United States
|
|-
|Win
|align=center|10–6
|Steve Sharp
|Submission (rear naked choke)
|Showdown Fights: Shootout
|
|align=center|1
|align=center|3:38
|Orem, Utah, United States
|
|-
|Loss
|align=center|9–6
|Jason Meaders
|TKO (cut)
|MEZ Sports: Pandemonium 4
|
|align=center|1
|align=center|3:00
|Riverside, California, United States
|
|-
|Loss
|align=center|9–5
|Mac Danzig
|Decision (unanimous)
|UFC 109
|
|align=center|3
|align=center|5:00
|Las Vegas, Nevada, United States
|
|-
|Loss
|align=center|9–4
|Jeremy Stephens
|TKO (cut)
|UFC Fight Night: Diaz vs. Guillard
|
|align=center|1
|align=center|3:23
|Oklahoma City, Oklahoma, United States
|
|-
|Loss
|align=center|9–3
|Terry Etim
|Submission (d'arce choke)
|UFC 99
|
|align=center|2
|align=center|2:38
|Cologne, Germany
|
|-
|Win
|align=center|9–2
|Corey Hill
|Submission (rear naked choke)
|UFC 86
|
|align=center|2
|align=center|3:57
|Las Vegas, Nevada, United States
|
|-
|Loss
|align=center|8–2
|Matt Wiman
|Submission (rear naked choke)
| UFC Fight Night 12
|
|align=center|1
|align=center|2:56
|Las Vegas, Nevada, United States
|
|-
|Win
|align=center|8–1
|Ikaika Choy-Fu
|TKO (punches)
|EliteXC: Uprising
|
|align=center|1
|align=center|1:35
|Honolulu, Hawaii, United States
|
|-
|Win
|align=center|7–1
|Marshall Harvest
|KO (punch)
|Icon Sport: Epic
|
|align=center|1
|align=center|0:31
|Honolulu, Hawaii, United States
|
|-
|Win
|align=center|6–1
|Brandon Pieper
|TKO (punches)
|Icon Sport: All In
|
|align=center|1
|align=center|1:07
|Honolulu, Hawaii, United States
|
|-
|Win
|align=center|5–1
|Arto Woods
|Submission (triangle choke)
|ROTR: Beatdown 2
|
|align=center|1
|align=center|2:34
|Hilo, Hawaii, United States
|
|-
|Win
|align=center|4–1
|Matt Peter
|KO (punch)
|Desert Brawl: Bikes, Babes, Brawls 
|
|align=center|1
|align=center|2:50
|Fairbanks, Alaska, United States
|
|-
|Loss
|align=center|3–1
|Rodney Rhoden
|TKO (referee stoppage)
|Alaska Fighting Championship 22
|
|align=center|1
|align=center|2:33
|Anchorage, Alaska, United States
|
|-
|Win
|align=center|3–0
|Bo Underwood
|DQ (illegal kick)
|Alaska Fighting Championship 12
|
|align=center|1
|align=center|N/A
|Anchorage, Alaska, United States
|
|-
|Win
|align=center|2–0
|Jimmy Gainey
|Submission (triangle choke)
|Alaska Fighting Championship 9
|
|align=center|2
|align=center|N/A
|Anchorage, Alaska, United States
|
|-
|Win
|align=center|1–0
|Andy Garnand
|Submission
|Alaska Fighting Championship 8
|
|align=center|1
|align=center|N/A
|Anchorage, Alaska, United States
|

References

External links
 
 

1983 births
American male mixed martial artists
American mixed martial artists of Filipino descent
Lightweight mixed martial artists
Mixed martial artists utilizing wrestling
Mixed martial artists utilizing Brazilian jiu-jitsu
Living people
Mixed martial artists from Alaska
Sportspeople from Fairbanks, Alaska
Ultimate Fighting Championship male fighters
American practitioners of Brazilian jiu-jitsu